The Jeguk Sinmun ("Imperial Post"; 1898-1910) was a Seoul-based Korean language newspaper founded in August 8, 1898 by Yi Jong-myeon(李鍾冕) It was published using the purely vernacular Hangeul script and attracted a largely lower or middle class and female readership. It was less political than the other papers of the period, concentrating instead on social issues. One of its early reporters was the young Syngman Rhee.

References

Korean-language newspapers
1898 establishments in Korea
1910 disestablishments in Asia
Newspapers published in Korea
Publications established in 1898